The West Adelaide state by-election, 1901 was a by-election held on 1 June 1901 for the South Australian House of Assembly seat of West Adelaide.

Results

The by-election was triggered by the election of West Adelaide MHA and former Labor leader Lee Batchelor to the inaugural Australian House of Representatives at the 1901 federal election. Although Labor candidate James Healey was favoured to succeed Batchelor, he was defeated by City of Adelaide councillor and Catholic community figure Francis Bernard Keogh.

See also
List of South Australian state by-elections

References

South Australian state by-elections
1901 elections in Australia
1900s in Adelaide